Dot Moore (May 15, 1914 - May 23, 2007) was an American TV personality and "ambassador" to the stars for 46 years from  Mobile, Alabama. Her long broadcasting career spanned four talk show incarnations, numerous trips to the east and west coasts of the United States, and dozens of conversations with television and motion picture stars. When she died, US Representative Jo Bonner honored her memory which is entered in the Congressional Record.

Early years

She was born in Pensacola, Florida, and her family moved to Mobile when she was 12. Dorothy "Dot" Fillette had her young mind and eyes set on becoming an actress. One indication was her attempt at imitating movies such as those featuring Joan Crawford, whom Dot viewed on days when she voluntarily skipped school. Eventually she concluded that theater didn't have a particular lure, even though she managed to perform on stage locally. Dot's interests to perform before an audience would resurface during her years on television, as it gave her an easy, yet natural feeling. Before fulfilling her lifelong dreams, Moore would finish her schooling at Leinkauf Elementary and Murphy High School before her first job as a secretary close to her father, who was in the steamship business.

She next worked in the registrar's office at the University of Alabama Expansion Center, sharpening her future interview skills in the process. While at the university, Dot was offered a place in the U.S. Army Corps of Engineers office in downtown Mobile and the U.S. Air Force office at Brookley Field. The investigative position at the Air Force office came shortly after she married Baltimore native Robert Joseph Miller. Her husband died from tuberculosis, leaving Dot and two-year-old year son Bobby behind.

Following her husband's death, Dot opened "Dot's Dress Shoppe" on  Springhill Avenue establishment. There, Dot met the two women who would introduce her to the radio and television business, a radio personality going on vacation and Connie Bea Hope who invited Dot over to her television show. Five years after Bob Miller's death, Dot met her second husband, Lon Stephens Moore of Missouri, when a friend invited him over to her Dauphin Street home. Again, illness would halt Dot's marriage, and the two people Mr. Moore knew very briefly were left alone again. Weeks after a period of mourning, Dot went back to work after finding a job at the same radio station that introduced her to broadcasting, WABB.

The half way point
Moore was a receptionist at WABB in 1958, a position under the Mobile Register-owned station that would lead to speaking before a wide radio audience with her low tone voice, earning the liking of one WABB announcer. Radio and TV commercials, including a televised March of Dimes public service announcement featuring Moore as a donor would earn her something more than a year after working for WABB and WKAB radio, the daily half-hour program "Channel 10 Kitchen" on WALA-TV after the previous chef had to leave for health reasons.  Dot, however, was not a cook.

WALA's solution was to find a professional chef and let Moore assist before the viewers. Dot also got the last remark in the program's live commercials sponsored by General Electric. Even after retirement, Dot was not very fond of cooking herself, yet up until the very end of her career, she was still seen speaking to her cooking guests in the studio kitchen. Dot managed to keep her son well nourished on something as easy to prepare as tuna fish casserole, in which Bobby would joke about at times. After the cooking show contract was finished, Dot returned to radio as a commercial copy writer in the WALA radio traffic department. There were also times when the TV side of the building called upon Dot for their commercials or public service spots. She was fired after a dispute with the new radio manager over paperwork that violates broadcasting rules in general. Termination gave Dot time to free-lance in media during the early 1960s.

In this busy period of trying to stay in Gulf Coast media and keeping things well at home, Dot was contacted by a WALA-TV announcer who wanted her to co-host the station's new program Poolside from the Admiral Semmes Hotel in downtown Mobile. Dot accepted the job and continued to expand her horizons, creatively and physically. After a successful run of Poolside, Dot returned to free-lancing, including some work for Gayfer's department store and their commercials for Pensacola station WEAR-TV. Just when Dot was getting ready to step out of the public eye after a week of commercials and public appearances in Pensacola, a friend employed at WALA stopped by the Gayfer's store to deliver her some good news. A new afternoon talk show of her very own was set to premiere on the following Monday, with all the guests booked for that week.

On May 14, 1963, Dot Moore & Company went the air between noon and 12:30p.m. The radio manager who had fired Dot was eventually fired shortly after learning of her return from his TV counterpart. Viewers from south Mississippi to the Florida panhandle also got to see Dot help WALA cover Mobile's Mardi Gras Day celebration for 33 years. Ten years after Dot Moore & Company went on the air, Dot was given an on-air partner named Danny Treanor and the show became known as Gulf Coast Today in 1973. The 9:00 a.m. program following NBC's Today continued with this format for the next four years until Dot regained the position of host and producer of the show.

In September 1979, Gulf Coast Today began airing once a week before it again bore Dot's name. The Dot Moore Show would remain on WALA's schedule well into the 21st century.

Dot and the stars
Over her career, Moore met numerous wealthy and famous people for TV interviews, which was quite easy for journalists and TV personalities during a time before satellite became a common way of conducting interviews. Out of all the people she's met, it was former Pensacola resident and friend Leif Erickson of the NBC western "The High Chaparral" who helped keep Dot's relationship with the network's stars alive for years to come. With such a Hollywood connection came a few roles on television, including Erickson's program and the show Movin' On with Claude Akins, another one of Dot's many guests (Movin' On was filmed on location once in Mobile and its surrounding areas). Besides people, Dot had an encounter with a Bengal tiger and its trainer, which went through fairly well despite a wet moment that would make Johnny Carson and the monkey he encountered laugh. All good things would come to an end in 1985, when NBC ended Moore's flights to visit the famous and must settle with the network's newly installed satellite technology to keep in touch, but there were exceptions. Art Linkletter and Jock Mahoney were Dot's first celebrated guests three weeks into her show's run. The "People Are Funny" emcee and the "Yancy Derringer" star happened to be in Mobile the same day. Ed McMahon made a visit to Mobile for the America's Junior Miss national finals in May 1973, plus he made a stop at WALA to appear on Moore's tenth anniversary show on May 14. "And now, here's Dottie!" was Ed's introduction for his friend Dot as she was getting ready to go on the air, which came as such a surprise that it never made it into the show's taping.

Later years
During the 1990s, Moore's Sunday community service program and fourth incarnation had a greater focus on public affairs figures than interviews with the stars. Despite her lessening presence over WALA-TV, which swapped its 43-year affiliation with NBC for Fox in 1996, Dot continued to tell people about her days of traveling outside Mobile. Hundreds of photos featuring her and the people she had met over the years served as a visual aid. Longtime viewers have noticed various changes in Dot's hairstyle and color since appearing on television. During her years under the eyes of sponsors, there were times when they wanted a blonde, brunette, or redheaded lady on the air. Dot would pay for her own hairstyle around 1994. Another surprise Dot had for her viewers were a pair of knee high boots from California, which had the WALA switchboard lit up by those interested in her footwear.

The Dot Moore Show went on the air for the last time on July 11, 2004, less than a week after Moore had a car accident. According to many Mobile residents, including friend and fellow local media personality Uncle Henry, this accident was the reason for Dot's retirement and move to Montgomery.  She died on May 23, 2007, in Montgomery, Alabama.

References

1914 births
2007 deaths
American women television personalities
People from Pensacola, Florida
Television personalities from Florida